Love Me Mama is the debut album by the American blues musician Luther Allison recorded in Chicago in 1969 and released by the Delmark label.

Reception

Allmusic reviewer Thom Owens stated "Although it has its moments -- particularly on the title track -- Luther Allison's debut album, Love Me Mama, is on the whole uneven, featuring more mediocre tracks than killer cuts. Nevertheless, it offers intriguing glimpses of the style he would later develop".

Track listing
All compositions by Luther Allison except where noted
 "Why I Love the Blues" − 4:06
 "Little Red Rooster" (Willie Dixon) − 4:31
 "4:00 in the Morning" (B.B. King, Ferdinand Washington) − 2:16
 "You Done Lost Your Good Thing Now" [alternate take] (King, Jo Josea) − 4:18 Additional track on CD reissue
 "Five Long Years" (Eddie Boyd) − 4:19
 "Dust My Broom" (Robert Johnson) − 3:35
 "Every Night About This Time" (Fats Domino) − 4:01 Additional track on CD reissue
 "Love Me Mama"− 3:58
 "The Sky Is Crying" (Elmore James) − 5:38
 "You Gotta Help Me" (Sonny Boy Williamson II, Ralph Bass, Dixon) − 3:51
 "You Done Lost You Good Thing Now" (King, Josea) − 3:36
 "Bloomington Closer" − 7:23
 "Little Red Rooster" [alternate take] (Dixon) − 5:21 Additional track on CD reissue
 "Walking from Door to Door" − 3:45 Additional track on CD reissue

Personnel
Luther Allison − guitar, vocals
Robert "Big Mojo" Elem − bass
Jim Conley − tenor saxophone (tracks 2, 6, 13 & 14)
Jimmy "Fast Fingers" Dawkins − guitar (tracks 2, 6, 8, 9, 13 & 14)
Bob Richey (2, 3, 6, 8, 9, 13 & 14), Bobby Davis (tracks 1, 4, 5, 7 & 10-12) – drums

References

Delmark Records albums
1969 albums
Luther Allison albums
Albums produced by Bob Koester